Roth is an English, German, or Jewish origin surname. There are seven theories:
 The spilling of blood from the warrior class of ancient Germanic soldiers;
 Ethnic name for an Anglo-Saxon, derived from rot (meaning "red" before the 7th century), referencing red-haired people;
 Topographical name, derived from rod (meaning "wood"), meaning a dweller in such a location;
 Derivative from hroth (from the Proto-Germanic word for "fame"; related to hrod);
 Local name for 18th-century Ashkenazi refugees to Germany;
 Derivative from roe in the ancient Danish language to signify (of) a king;
 Of the red colour of clay, as in pottery (German).

Note: Roth is not originally a Hebrew surname. Its origins are in northern Europe, and it is a common name in Scotland and other English-speaking countries as well as in German-speaking countries. For historic reasons, the Jewish people adopted various established names, many of which were common amongst non-Jewish people in their respective countries.

The first English-language historic record of the surname 'Roth' appeared in the United Kingdom in Colchester and Essex public records in 1346.

People with the surname Roth

People with the surname Roth include:

A–F
 Agustina Roth (born 2001), BMX rider
 Aharon Roth (1894–1947), Hasidic rabbi
 Albrecht Wilhelm Roth (1757–1834), German physician and botanist
 Alice Roth (1905–1977), Swiss mathematician
 Alvin E. Roth (aka Al Roth) (born 1951), American economist
 Alvin Roth (1930s–?), American basketball player
 Alvin Roth (bridge) (1914–2007), American bridge player
 Andrew Roth (1919–2010), British political biographer
 Ann Roth (born 1931), American costume designer
 Arnie Roth, American musician
 Andreas Roth (runner), Norwegian middle-distance runner.
 Andreas Roth (painter), German painter.
 Andreas Roth (lawyer), German lawyer.
 Arnold Roth (born 1929), American cartoonist
 Asher Roth (born 1985), American rapper
 Bruce Roth (born 1954), American chemist
 Carl Roth (basketball) (1909–1966), American basketball player and coach
 Carl Roth of Nedre Fösked (1712–1788), Swedish blacksmith, farrier and ironmaster
 Carl Roth II (1753–1832), Swedish ironmaster 
 Carl Reinhold Roth (1797–1858), Swedish businessman and ironmaster
 Cecil Roth (1899–1970), British-Israeli historian
 Celso Roth (born 1957), Brazilian football (soccer) coach
 Charles Roth, American politician
 Claudia Roth (born 1955), German politician
 Dagmar Roth-Behrendt (born 1953), German lawyer and politician
 Daniel Roth (organist) (born 1942), French organist
 Daniel Roth (writer), financial journalist and senior writer at Wired magazine
 David Roth (disambiguation), multiple people
 David Lee Roth (born 1954), American, original and present lead singer of Van Halen
 Dick Roth (born 1947), American 1964 Olympic gold medalist swimmer
 Dieter Roth (1930–1998), German-born Swiss printmaker and mixed-media artist
 Ed Roth (1932–2001), American artist and cartoonist
 Eli Roth (born 1972), American film director, producer, writer and actor
 Emery Roth (1871–1948), Hungarian-American architect
 Eric Roth (born 1945), American screenwriter
 Erich Roth (SS officer) (born 1910 in Auschwitz – executed 1947 in Yugoslavia for war crimes), Nazi SS and Gestapo officer
 Ernie Roth (1929–1983), American wrestling manager of heels
 Ernst Roth (1896–1971), Austrian-British music publisher
 Ernst Heinrich Roth (1877–1948), German violin maker
 Esther Roth-Shahamorov (born 1952), Israeli track and field athlete
 Eugen Roth (1895–1976), German lyricist and poet
 Ferdinando Roth (1815–1898) Famous Milan based musical instrument maker and inventor of the Rothphone
 Frances Levenstein Roth (1896–1971) was an American lawyer and founding director of the Culinary Institute of America.
 Francois-Xavier Roth (born 1971), French conductor
 Frederick Roth (1872–1944), American sculptor and animalier
 Friederike Roth (born 1948), German writer
 Friedrich Ritter von Röth (1893–1918), German flying ace

G–L
 Gabrielle Roth, American musician, "urban shaman"
 Gerhard Roth, (several people)
 Heinrich Roth (1620–1668), German missionary
 Henry Roth (1906–1995), American novelist and short story writer
 Henry Ling Roth (1855–1925), English-born anthropologist, active in Australia
 Holly Roth (born 1916), American crime writer who disappeared at sea
 J. D. Roth (born 1968), American TV personality, actor, children's game show host, TV voice-over performer, TV reality show producer
 Jane Richards Roth (born 1935), American federal judge
 Joanna Roth (born 1965), Danish-born actress
 Joe Roth (born 1948), American entertainment executive, producer and film director
 Joe Roth (American football) (c. 1955–1977), American college football player
 Joel Roth (born 1???), American rabbi
 Johannes Roth (1815–1858), German zoologist
 John Roth (disambiguation), multiple people
 Joseph Roth (1894–1939), Austrian novelist
 Jürgen Roth (1945–2017), German publicist and investigative journalist
 Justus Ludwig Adolf Roth (1818–1892), German geologist and mineralogist
 Kip Roth, American para-alpine skier
 Klaus Roth (1925–2015), British mathematician
 Laura M. Roth, American physicist
 Leah Lenke Roth (1918–2012), Israeli swimwear fashion designer
 Leonard Roth (1904–1968), British mathematician
 Lurline Matson Roth (1890–1985), American heiress, equestrian, philanthropist
 Ludwig Roth (1909–1967), German rocket scientist

M–W
 Mark Roth (born 1951), American pro bowler
 Martin Roth (disambiguation), multiple people
 Marty Roth (born 1958), Canadian race car driver
 Matt Roth (American football) (born 1982), American football player
 Matt Roth (actor) (born 1964), American actor
 Michael Roth (disambiguation), multiple people
 Mike Roth, American writer and producer
 Miriam Roth (1910–2005), Israeli writer and scholar of children's books, kindergarten teacher, and educator
 Moran Roth (born 1982), Israeli basketball player
 Nina Roth (born 1988), American Olympic curler
 Otto Roth (1884–1956), Commissioner-in-Chief of the Banat Republic
 Petra Roth (born 1944), German politician, mayor of Frankfurt
 Phil Roth (1930–2002), American television and film actor
 Philip Roth (1933–2018), American novelist
 Philipp Roth (1853–1898), German cellist
 Phillip J. Roth (born 1959), American producer, director and screenwriter
 Rolf Roth (born 1938), Swiss chess master
 Randy Roth (born 1954), American murderer
 Richard Roth (disambiguation), multiple people
 Roger Roth (born 1978), American politician
 Sanford H. Roth (1906–1962), American photographer
 Simon Roth, Swiss curler
 Stephen John Roth (1908–1974), United States federal judge
 Stephan Ludwig Roth (1796–1849), Transylvanian Saxon intellectual, pedagogue and Lutheran pastor
 Steven Roth, real estate investor and founder of Vornado Realty Trust
 Susanna Roth (1950–1997), Swiss bohemist and literary translator
 Thomas Roth (born 1951), German news television presenter
 Tim Roth (born 1961), English film actor and director
 Trudi Roth (1930–2016), Swiss actress.
 Ulrich Roth (born 1954), German electric guitarist
 Veronica Roth (born 1988), American novelist and short story writer
 Vladimír Roth (born 1990), Czech ice hockey player
 Walter Roth (1861–1933), English anthropologist in Australia
 Walter Roth (Minnesota politician) (1893–1973), American farmer and politician
 Werner Roth (comics) (1921–1973), American comic book artist
 Werner Roth (soccer) (born 1948), American soccer player
 William M. Roth (1916–2014), American politician
 William V. Roth, Jr. (1921–2003), American lawyer and politician
 Yechezkel Roth, rabbi
 Yoel Roth, Twitter’s former head of trust and safety

See also
 Rothe
Liljeroth
Rothchild

References

English-language surnames
German-language surnames
Jewish surnames
Yiddish-language surnames
Surnames from nicknames
de:Roth (Begriffsklärung)
es:Roth
eo:Roth (apartigilo)
fr:Roth
nl:Roth
ja:ロート
no:Roth
pl:Roth